Louisiana's 24th State Senate district is one of 39 districts in the Louisiana State Senate. It has been represented by Democrat Gerald Boudreaux since 2016, succeeding Democrat-turned-Republican Elbert Guillory.

Geography
District 24 stretches across several majority-black sections of Lafayette, St. Landry, and St. Martin Parishes in Acadiana, including northern Lafayette and some or all of Carencro, Scott, Sunset,  Opelousas, Eunice, and Port Barre. 

The district overlaps with Louisiana's 3rd, 4th, and 5th congressional districts, and with the 38th, 39th, 40th, 41st, 44th, 46th, and 96th districts of the Louisiana House of Representatives.

Recent election results
Louisiana uses a jungle primary system. If no candidate receives 50% in the first round of voting, when all candidates appear on the same ballot regardless of party, the top-two finishers advance to a runoff election.

2019

2015

2011

Federal and statewide results in District 24

References

Louisiana State Senate districts
Lafayette Parish, Louisiana
St. Landry Parish, Louisiana
St. Martin Parish, Louisiana